Ganges Water Aerodrome  is located  southeast of Ganges on Saltspring Island in British Columbia, Canada.

Airlines and destinations

See also
 List of airports in the Gulf Islands

References

Seaplane bases in British Columbia
Transport in the Capital Regional District
Salt Spring Island
Registered aerodromes in British Columbia
Airports in the Gulf Islands